Keith Bernard Burns (born May 16, 1972) is an American football coach and former professional linebacker and special teams player. He was formerly the Special Teams coordinator for the Washington Redskins of the National Football League.

Early life and high school
Burns was born in Greeleyville, South Carolina. He was raised by his mother, Tracy, in Alexandria, Virginia as the youngest of four children.
He was a 1990 graduate of T. C. Williams High School in Alexandria, where he won three varsity letters in football, two in basketball, and one in baseball.

College
Burns lettered in football at Navarro Junior College in Corsicana, Texas where he garnered first-team JuCo All-America honors, and finished his sophomore season with six sacks, three interceptions, and 192 tackles.

Burns then transferred to Oklahoma State  for the 1992-1993 season and immediately made an impact with 126 tackles (102 solo), 5 sacks, and 3 forced fumbles.  He was voted captain of the team after just four games and was named the Big Eight Conference's Defensive Newcomer of the Year.  Entering his final year at Oklahoma State, he made several pre-season All-America teams and was ranked the No. 1 inside linebacker by The Sporting News.  He was named to the conference's All-Big Eight team both of his years there.

Playing career
The Denver Broncos drafted Burns in the 7th round (#210 overall) of the 1994 NFL Draft. A Bronco for most of his thirteen-year career, Burns saw playing time as a reserve linebacker and a prominent special teams player. He spent the 1999 season with Chicago Bears, and the 2004 season with Tampa Bay Buccaneers. He won two Super Bowls with the Broncos.  For his entire NFL career, Burns played 197 games (3 starts) and totaled 231 special-teams tackles. He also posted 77 career defensive stops (50 solo), 1.5 sacks (9 yds.), one interception (15 yds.), three pass breakups and one forced fumble.

Coaching career
On March 27, 2007, the Broncos announced Burns would retire as Special Teams Captain and assume the role of instructing the special teams.  He was given the title of Assistant Special Teams Coach in 2011.

Burns was hired by the Washington Redskins to be their Special Teams Coordinator on February 11, 2013. In moving to Washington, he rejoined Mike Shanahan who was his coach in Denver and who also gave Burns his first coaching job. In his first coaching position Keith Burns' Special Teams unit struggled during 2013 season. According to Football Outsiders, under Burns' leadership, the Washington Redskins' Special Teams unit finished the 2013 regular season ranked last in points compared to league average. After less than a year in the position, Keith Burns was dismissed by the Washington Redskins on December 30, 2013 along with Mike Shanahan.

Personal life
Burns met his wife, Michelle, at college.  They have three children together.  His oldest daughter, Danielle is a star for the women's basketball team at Fordham University, wearing number 22. Danielle earned her masters in just four years, having graduated in three years. His other daughter Rachel is currently a member of Charleston Southern. His son Keith is still in High School. In Keith Burns' off time, he has performed stand-up comedy routines around the country.

References

External links
 Tennessee State profile

1972 births
Living people
American football linebackers
Chicago Bears players
Denver Broncos coaches
Denver Broncos players
Los Angeles Chargers coaches
Navarro Bulldogs football players
Oklahoma State Cowboys football players
Tampa Bay Buccaneers players
Tennessee State Tigers football coaches
Washington Redskins coaches
T. C. Williams High School alumni
Sportspeople from Alexandria, Virginia
People from Williamsburg County, South Carolina
Coaches of American football from Virginia
Players of American football from Virginia
African-American coaches of American football
African-American players of American football
21st-century African-American sportspeople
20th-century African-American sportspeople
Ed Block Courage Award recipients